Bellevue Public Schools operates 15 elementary schools (K-6; some schools also offer pre-kindergarten programs), three middle schools (7-8), and two high schools (9-12) in Bellevue in the U.S. state of Nebraska.  The district has 662 teachers (FTEs) serving 9,666 students.

The district includes most of Bellevue, and almost all of Offutt Air Force Base.

Note: Based on 2002–2003 school year data

See also
 List of school districts in Nebraska

References

External links
 Bellevue Public Schools website

Bellevue, Nebraska
School districts in Nebraska
Schools in Sarpy County, Nebraska